USS Rentz (FFG-46) was a United States Navy  guided missile frigate. He was the only Navy chaplain to be so honored during World War II.

History 
Rentz had her keel laid on 18 September 1982 at Todd Pacific Shipyards, Los Angeles Division, San Pedro, California. She was launched 16 July 1983, sponsored by Mrs. Jean R. Lansing, daughter of Chaplain Rentz, and commissioned at Naval Station Long Beach on 30 June 1984. In attendance were Jean Lansing and survivors of Houston.

In December 1985, Rentz moved from Long Beach, California to San Diego, California. Following initial shakedown cruises and operations, Rentz was assigned to the  Carrier Strike Group (CSG). On 5 November 1986, Rentz was part of an historic visit to Qingdao, China, the first US Naval visit to China since 1949. Rentz was accompanied by cruiser  and destroyer . The visit was officially hosted by the Chinese People's Liberation Army Navy (PLAN). Previously,  was the last ship to moor in China, departing in 1949 when the communists forced the Americans to leave the Chinese mainland.

In July 1987, Rentz was sent to the Persian Gulf as part of Operation Earnest Will. Her primary duties consisted of escorting commercial vessels through the Strait of Hormuz. Rentz provided missile security escort for the North Persian Gulf Battlegroup destroyers during their transit in and out of the Straits of Hormuz en route to operation "Nimble Archer", involving naval gun bombardment and SEAL Team take over of an abandoned oil rig being used by the Iranian Revolutionary Guard to stage attacks on Persian Gulf shipping. Rentz has been deployed to the Persian Gulf numerous times since 1987.

On 28 November 2009 while the ship was moored in Jebel Ali, United Arab Emirates as part of the  CSG, a crewman was killed while performing repairs to the ship. According to the Navy, a 3rd Class Petty Officer was electrocuted while working in an auxiliary machinery space. In response to the mishap, the Navy ordered the entire fleet to inspect ship electrical enclosures.

In December 2013, Rentz intercepted a small drug smuggling vessel in the United States Fourth Fleet area of responsibility as part of an anti-drug trafficking operation, Operation Martillo. The vessel contained approximately 313 kilograms of Cocaine worth an estimated $10.4 million. This was the fourth successful such intercept, bringing the total amount of cocaine seized by Rentz to approximately 3,000 kilograms.

Fate 

Rentz was sunk as part of the 2016 SINKEX exercise Valiant Shield. The exercise was led by aircraft from Carrier Air Wing Five (CVW 5)."Live fire from ships and aircraft participating in Valiant Shield 2016 sank the decommissioned USS Rentz (FFG 46) in waters 30,000 feet deep and 117 nautical miles northeast of Guam Sept. 13 . . . The ship sank in five hours after sustaining 22 missile hits, finally succumbing to hellfire missiles shots by the “Golden Falcons” of HSC-12."

Awards 

 "Outstanding food service" in the Pacific Fleet, 1997 Ney Award winner "Small Afloat."
 "Outstanding food service" in the Pacific Fleet, 2000 Ney runner-up "Small Afloat."
2003 Mobility Energy Efficiency award from the Federal Emergency Management Agency.

The Ship's Crest 
The colours blue and gold are traditionally associated with the U.S. Navy. The vertical trident represents the sea god Neptune. The crossed missiles indicate the type of ship "Frigate with Guided Missiles." The cross on the shield symbolizes the ship's namesake, Chaplain Rentz. The motto "Dread Nought" tells all to have no fear for the ship is watched over by higher powers.

References

External links 

 

USS Rentz SinkEX During Valiant Shield
USS Rentz cruise books
 navysite.de: USS Rentz
USS Rentz at Destroyer History
U.S. NAVY HELO CREW RESCUED BY USS RENTZ, COMNAVAIRPAC Press Release 1997: PR97-015
MaritimeQuest USS Rentz FFG-46 pages
Defense Visual Information Center (search for "Rentz")
Decommissioning booklet for USS Rentz

 

Ships built in Los Angeles
1983 ships
Oliver Hazard Perry-class frigates of the United States Navy
Gulf War ships of the United States
Carrier Strike Group One
Ships sunk as targets